Dorcadion pittinorum is a species of beetle in the family Cerambycidae. It was described by Pesarini and Sabbadini in 1998. It is known from Turkey.

References

pittinorum
Beetles described in 1998